The Yeoh hyperelastic material model is a phenomenological model for the deformation of nearly incompressible, nonlinear elastic materials such as rubber. The model is based on Ronald Rivlin's observation that the elastic properties of rubber may be described using a strain energy density function which is a power series in the strain invariants  of the Cauchy-Green deformation tensors. Since a polynomial form of the strain energy density function is used but all the three invariants of the left Cauchy-Green deformation tensor are not, the Yeoh model is also called the reduced polynomial model.

Yeoh model for incompressible rubbers

Strain energy density function 
The original model proposed by Yeoh had a cubic form with only  dependence and is applicable to purely incompressible materials.  The strain energy density for this model is written as

where  are material constants. The quantity  can be interpreted as the initial shear modulus.

Today a slightly more generalized version of the Yeoh model is used.  This model includes  terms and is written as

When  the Yeoh model reduces to the neo-Hookean model for incompressible materials.

For consistency with linear elasticity the Yeoh model has to satisfy the condition

where  is the shear modulus of the material.

Therefore, the consistency condition for the Yeoh model is

Stress-deformation relations 
The Cauchy stress for the incompressible Yeoh model is given by

Uniaxial extension 
From incompressibility . Hence . 
Therefore,

The left Cauchy-Green deformation tensor can then be expressed as

If the directions of the principal stretches are oriented with the coordinate basis vectors, we have

Since , we have

Therefore,

The engineering stress is

Equibiaxial extension 
From incompressibility . Hence .  
Therefore,

The left Cauchy-Green deformation tensor can then be expressed as

If the directions of the principal stretches are oriented with the coordinate basis vectors, we have

Since , we have

Therefore,

The engineering stress is

Planar extension 
Planar extension tests are carried out on thin specimens which are constrained from deforming in one direction. From incompressibility . Hence .  
Therefore,

The left Cauchy-Green deformation tensor can then be expressed as

If the directions of the principal stretches are oriented with the coordinate basis vectors, we have

Since , we have

Therefore,

The engineering stress is

Yeoh model for compressible rubbers 
A version of the Yeoh model that includes  dependence is used for compressible rubbers.  The strain energy density function for this model is written as

The quantity  is interpreted as half the initial shear modulus, while  is interpreted as half the initial bulk modulus.

When  the compressible Yeoh model reduces to the neo-Hookean model for incompressible materials.

References

See also 
 Hyperelastic material
 Strain energy density function
 Mooney-Rivlin solid
 Finite strain theory
 Stress measures

Elasticity (physics)
Rubber properties
Solid mechanics
Continuum mechanics